The athletics competitions at the 2015 Palarong Pambansa in Tagum were held at the Davao del Norte Sports Complex from 3–8 May 2015.

Medal summary 
(PR = Palarong Pambansa Record)

Elementary

Boys

Girls

Highschool

Boys

References:

Girls

References:

References

Palarong Pambansa
Palarong